Earl Chudoff (November 15, 1907 – May 17, 1993) was an American lawyer and jurist who served five terms as a Democratic member of the U.S. House of Representatives from Pennsylvania from 1949 to 1958.

Early life and career 
Earl Chudoff was born in Philadelphia, Pennsylvania.  He graduated from the Wharton School of the University of Pennsylvania in economics in 1929 and from the University of Pittsburgh School of Law in 1932.

He worked as a building and loan examiner for the Pennsylvania State Department of Banking from 1936 to 1939.

World War II 
He served as chief boatswain's mate in the United States Coast Guard Reserve from December 1942 to September 1945.

Political career 
He was a member of the Pennsylvania State House of Representatives from 1941 to 1948.

Congress 
Chudoff was elected as a Democrat to the Eighty-first Congress, defeating incumbent Republican Congressman Franklin J. Maloney, and was re-elected to the four succeeding Congresses, beginning on January 3, 1949.

He resigned on January 5, 1958, having been elected judge of the Pennsylvania Courts of Common Pleas No. 1 (defeating the incumbent, Joseph L. Kun in the 1957 election). He served in that capacity until his resignation in 1974.

Death 
He died in Philadelphia in 1993.

See also
List of Jewish members of the United States Congress

References
 Retrieved on 2009-5-17
 "Earl Chudoff, Representative From Pa., Dies", The Washington Post, May 19, 1993.

1907 births
1993 deaths
Politicians from Philadelphia
Democratic Party members of the United States House of Representatives from Pennsylvania
Democratic Party members of the Pennsylvania House of Representatives
Judges of the Pennsylvania Courts of Common Pleas
University of Pittsburgh School of Law alumni
Wharton School of the University of Pennsylvania alumni
20th-century American politicians
20th-century American judges